Esteve is both a Spanish (Catalan) surname and a given name. Notable people with the name include:

Agustín Esteve (1753–1830), Spanish painter
Alicia Esteve Head (born 1973), Spanish hoaxer
Antoni Esteve Subirana (1902–1979), Spanish pharmacist
Esteve Rabat (born 1989), Spanish motorcycle racer
Genís Boadella i Esteve (born 1979), Catalan politician
Henri Esteve (born 1989), American actor
Irineu Esteve Altimiras (born 1996), Andorran cross-country skier
José Esteve Juan (1550–1603), Spanish Roman Catholic bishop
Josep Esteve i Seguí (1873–1927), Spanish pharmacist and folklorist
Josep Esteve i Soler (born 1930), Spanish industrialist
Kevin Esteve Rigail (born 1989), Andorran alpine skier
María Esteve (born 1974), Spanish actress
Pablo Esteve (1730–1794), Spanish classical composer
Pedro Esteve (1865–1925), Spanish anarchist in the United States
Pelegrín Esteve, Spanish sport shooter
Pere Esteve (1942–2005), Spanish politician
Wilfrid Esteve (born 1968), French photojournalist
Yaiza Esteve (born 1994), Spanish actress and singer
Alicia Esteve Head (born 1973), Spanish Impostor

See also
Elizabeth Esteve-Coll (born 1938), British academic

See also
Esteves, a Portuguese surname
Estevez, a Spanish surname

Spanish-language surnames
Catalan-language surnames